Pseuduvaria lignocarpa is a species of plant in the family Annonaceae. It is native to New Guinea. James Sinclair, the Scottish botanist who first formally described the species, named it after the woody ( in Latin) wall of its fruit (Latinized form of Greek , karpos).

Description
It is a tree reaching 9 meters in height. The young, dark brown to black branches are sparsely hairy. Its elliptical to egg-shaped, leathery leaves are 11.5-19 by 3.5-6 centimeters. The leaves have pointed bases and tapering tips, with the tapering portion 10-20 millimeters long. The leaves are hairless on their upper and lower surfaces. The leaves have 10-16 pairs of secondary veins emanating from their midribs. Its sparsely hairy petioles are 6-11 by 1-2.5 millimeters with a narrow groove on their upper side. Its Inflorescences occur alone or in pairs on branches, and are organized on indistinct peduncles. Each inflorescence has up to 2 flowers. Each flower is on a densely hairy pedicel that is 2-3 by 0.3-1 millimeters. The pedicels are organized on a rachis up to 5 millimeters long that have 2 bracts. The pedicels have a medial, very densely hairy bract that is 0.5 millimeters long. Its flowers are unisexual. Its flowers have 3 free, oval sepals, that are 0.7-1 by 0.7-1 millimeters. The sepals are hairless on their upper surface, very densely hairy on their lower surface, and hairy at their margins. Its 6 petals are arranged in two rows of 3. The dull brown to olive-colored, oval, outer petals are 1.5-2 by 1.5-2 millimeters. The outer petals have hairless upper surfaces and densely hairy lower surfaces. The dark crimson to brown, diamond-shaped, inner petals have a 0.5-0.8 millimeter long claw at their base and a 2.5-3.5 by 2-2.5 millimeter blade. The inner petals have pointed bases and tips. The inner petals are hairless on their upper surfaces and densely hairy on their lower surfaces. Male flowers have 19-21 stamens that are 0.5-0.7 by 0.5-0.7 millimeters. The olive-colored fruit are attached by slightly hairy pedicles that are 8 by 2.5 millimeters. The fruit are elliptical and 47 by 40-46 millimeters. The fruit are smooth, and very densely hairy. Each fruit has up to 11 seeds in two rows.  The lens-shaped, wrinkly seeds are 16-23.5 by 9.5-13 by 3.5-6 millimeters.

Reproductive biology
The pollen of P. lignocarpa is shed as permanent tetrads.

Habitat and distribution
It has been observed growing in lowland and submontane forests at elevations of 150-1370 meters.

References

lignocarpa
Flora of New Guinea 
Plants described in 1956
Taxa named by James Sinclair (botanist)